"Suffer the Little Children" is a horror short story by American writer Stephen King. It was first published by Cavalier in February 1972. The story was later published as part of the collection Nightmares & Dreamscapes in 1993. In the "Notes" section of Nightmares & Dreamscapes, King wrote that it was originally supposed to be published in his 1978 collection Night Shift, but editor Bill Thompson opted to have it cut. King had wanted to cut "Gray Matter", but deferred to Thompson's choice.

King has stated that the story reminds him of the works of Ray Bradbury, and similarities have been noted by other authors as well. King also wrote that the story had "no redeeming social merit whatever." In The Complete Stephen King Universe, it's described as an "effective chiller."

Plot summary
Miss Emily Sidley is a third grade teacher. On one particular day, while she's teaching spelling, Sidley gets the disconcerting feeling that one of her students is staring at her. She turns around and notices that Robert, the quietest student, has his gaze fixed on her. During the following week, Miss Sidley eventually punishes Robert for her suspicions. Robert taunts her by asking her if she wants to see him "change", which he does (whether it really happened or was a figment of her imagination is not exactly explained) and terrifies the teacher who runs screaming and is nearly run down by a bus.

After the incident, Miss Sidley takes a leave of absence. When she returns, Robert taunts her at recess about there being more creatures at school, posing as normal children. They have replaced the real children they look like, who are imprisoned within their doppelgangers. He says of the real Robert: "I can hear him screaming, Miss Sidley. He wants me to let him out."

The things Robert is saying soon get to Miss Sidley, and the terrified teacher decides to take drastic measures. She takes out her deceased brother's pistol from a drawer and puts it in her purse. That day at school, she takes twelve of her students to a testing room where sound is well-concealed, and shoots each one dead. Another teacher comes in as Sidley is preparing to shoot a thirteenth student, and Sidley's bad back gives way as the other teacher struggles with her.

Miss Sidley is sent to a mental institution after the murders. She works with little preschoolers each day for therapy. One day she feels the fear that drove her to her crime and asks to be removed from the room. As she is taken away, some of the children slyly watch her, implying that they are also doppelgangers. That night, Miss Sidley commits suicide by slashing her throat and her former psychiatrist soon focuses intently on the children.

Adaptation

Bernardo Villela made a Dollar Baby film adaptation. The audiobook version was narrated by actress Whoopi Goldberg.

A 2017 short film directed by Alexander Domogarov Jr. was released, titled Let the Children in ("Пустите детей"). The film was made for the YouTube platform in the Russian language with English subtitles.  

A film adaptation is in the works from producers Craig Flores, Nicolas Chartier and Sriram Das. It will be directed by Sean Carter.

See also
 Stephen King short fiction bibliography

References

Short stories by Stephen King
1993 short stories
Mass murder in fiction
Horror short stories
Works originally published in Cavalier (magazine)
Short stories adapted into films